The Filmfare Award for Best Comedian – Telugu was given by the Filmfare magazine as part of its annual Filmfare Awards South for Telugu films between 2002 and 2005.

The award was introduced and first given at the 50th South Filmfare Awards in 2003, with Brahmanandam being the first recipient. This category has been retired from 2005. Here is a list of the award winners and the films for which they won.

See also 
 Filmfare Awards (Telugu)
 Cinema of Andhra Pradesh

References

Comedian